Phyllonorycter luzonica is a moth of the family Gracillariidae. It is known from Luzon island in the Philippines.

The wingspan is 4.2-4.7 mm.

The larvae feed on Celtis species. They mine the leaves of their host plant. The mine has the form of a tentiform blotch-mine occurring on the lower side of the leaf, usually on the space between lateral veins or sometimes along the leaf margin. It is oblong and 1.5 to 2 mm long and has a contracted lower epidermis with two or three longitudinal wrinkles. The lateral margins of the mine are sometimes united with each other to form a cylindrical chamber in the mine-cavity. Pupation takes place inside the mine without a particular cocoon.

References

luzonica
Moths of Asia
Moths described in 1995